Krokan is a traditional Swedish dessert.  It is a multi-tiered pastry made from almond flour, constructed of thin pieces baked in decorative patterns. The parts are then joined using melted caramelized sugar, assembled into a tower, and decorated with crisscross patterns and marzipan roses.

Krokans are common at weddings, such as that of King Carl XVI Gustaf in 1976. Krokan was the showstopper challenge in episode 9 of season 13 of The Great British Bake Off.

See also 

 Kransekage – Danish pastry which uses the same ingredients
 Swedish cuisine

References 

Swedish pastries
Wedding food